The BVIFA National Football League is the highest competitive football league in the British Virgin Islands. The league was founded in 2009 after the merger between the Tortola League and the Virgin Gorda League.

In 2012 the league decided to split the teams into two groups, based on the position they finished in the standings at the end of the 2011-12 season.

The majority of matches in the league are held at the national stadium, the 1,500-capacity A.O. Shirley Recreation Ground, based in Road Town, Tortola. Matches are also held on the island of Virgin Gorda.

Current Teams - 2020–21

Islanders FC
Old Madrid FC
Panthers FC
Rebels FC 
Lion Heart FC

Sugar Boys FC
Sea Argo FC
VG United
Wolues FC 
One Love FC

Previous Winners
2009–10: Islanders FC
2010–11: Islanders FC
2011–12: Islanders FC
2012–13: Islanders FC
2013–14: Islanders FC
2014–15: Islanders FC (9-a-side)
2015–16: Sugar Boys (9-a-side)
2016–17: Islanders FC
2018: One Love United FC
2019–20: Islanders FC 
2021: Sugar Boys
2021-22: Sugar Boys
2022-23:

Domestic Cup Competitions
There are two domestic cup competitions played prior to the start of the league season, which were both founded in 2010. They are the Terry Evans Knockout Cup, which is named after the former BVIFA President and one of the forefathers of football in the British Virgin Islands.

And the Wendol Williams Cup (also known as the Caribbean Cellars Wendol Williams Cup), which is played in memory of former BVIFA executive member Wendol Williams, who died aged 39 on 6 June 2010 on his way to the FIFA congress in South Africa ahead of the 2010 FIFA World Cup.

Terry Evans Knockout Cup

Wendol Williams Cup

Heineken Challenge Cup

Top scorers

References

External links
British Virgin Islands - List of Champions, RSSSF.com
BVIFA National League, Soccerway

 
Football competitions in the British Virgin Islands
Top level football leagues in the Caribbean
Sports leagues established in 2009
2009 establishments in the British Virgin Islands